Rosolska (feminine:Rosolska) is a Polish surname. Notable people with the surname include:

Aleksandra Rosolska (born 1984), Polish tennis player
Alicja Rosolska (born 1985), Polish tennis player, younger sister of Aleksandra
Rafał Rosolski (born 1991), Polish canoeist

Polish-language surnames